Disulfurous acid or pyrosulfurous acid  is an oxoacid of sulfur with the formula H2S2O5. The salts of disulfurous acid are called disulfites or metabisulfites. Disulfurous acid is, like sulfurous acid (H2SO3), a phantom acid, which does not exist in the free state. In contrast to disulfate, disulfite has two directly connected sulfur atoms. The oxidation state of the sulfur atom bonded to three oxygen atoms is +5 while that of the other is +3.

References

Sulfur oxoacids
Metabisulfites
Hypothetical chemical compounds